Paragortonia leptoforma is a species of beetle in the family Cerambycidae. It was described by Chemsak & Noguera in 2001.

References

Trachyderini
Beetles described in 2001